Compton Abbott Archer (3 July 1885 – 24 May 1961) was an Australian politician.

He was born in Longford, Tasmania. In 1944 he was elected to the Tasmanian Legislative Council as the independent member for Macquarie. He held the seat until his defeat in 1950. Archer died in Hagley in 1961.

References

1885 births
1961 deaths
Independent members of the Parliament of Tasmania
Members of the Tasmanian Legislative Council
20th-century Australian politicians